Christopher Brown (born 25 February 1973) is a New Zealand television and theatre actor. His first television role was a regular role in the New Zealand soap opera Shortland Street playing villainous Oscar Henry. He later played teacher Brent Townsend-Ross in the Network Ten sitcom Sit Down, Shut Up. He won an accolade at the 2003 New Zealand Film Awards for his main role in the 2003 film Orphans and Angels.

Brown has often concentrated on his theatre career and co-wrote his one man show titled Mr. Phase which premiered in 2002. The Green Room Awards recognised his on-stage work with a Best Supporting Actor nomination in 2003.

Career
Brown studied drama at the Victorian College of the Arts and was a successful graduate. His television career began in 1998, as business manager Oscar Henry in the New Zealand soap opera Shortland Street. The character was a villain who had manipulative tendencies. Brown left the series in 1999 and his character was killed off in an explosion caused by Mackenzie Choat (Ingrid Park). In 2012, TVNZ named the character as one of Shortland Street's best ever villains.

The actor gained guest roles as Pythagoras in the Fox Kids drama Young Hercules (1999), Steve in High Flyers (1999) and Roberto Sistini in Nine Network's drama series Stingers (2000). In 2000, Brown played the "self-absorbed" Performance Arts Teacher Brent Townsend-Ross in the Network Ten sitcom Sit Down, Shut Up.

In 2002, he played the guest role of Barry Childers in an episode of the first series of Australian Broadcasting Corporation show MDA. Brown had co-wrote his own theatre play with Thomas Howie, titled Mr. Phase. The play had been in development since 2000. It was stylised as a one man show which was directed by Margaret Cameron and performed at the Melbourne International Festival in 2002.

The actor played the male lead role of John alongside actress Emmeline Hawthorne in the 2003 film Orphans and Angels. Brown won the "Special Jury Prize - Digital Feature" accolade at the 2003 New Zealand Film Awards for his role in Orphans and Angels. The actor went onto star in a stage production titled Yet Each Man Kills The Thing He Loves, for which he received a 2003 Green Room Award nomination for "Best Supporting Actor".

In 2013, Brown played the guest role of Royce in ABC's comedy It's a Date. In September 2014, Brown performed the main role in the stage production of Bent at the Theatre Works in St Kilda, Victoria. Bent focused on the Nazi persecution of gay men during World War II and were identified by a Pink triangle. Also that year he played Rick the Architect in the Nine Network crime drama Fat Tony & Co..

The actor played the supporting role of Neil Murray in the 2018 Network Ten drama series Playing for Keeps. Brown has often concentrated on theatre work and has had roles with production companies such as the Melbourne Theatre Company, Sydney Theatre Company, Malthouse Theatre and the Belvoir theatre group. The actor is also scheduled to appear in a film titled Breeding in Captivity.

Filmography

Sources:

Awards and nominations

References

External links
 
 Christopher Brown at Mollison Keightley

Living people
21st-century New Zealand male actors
New Zealand male television actors
1973 births